Russell Jackson "Rusty" Grills (born October 1, 1981) is an American farmer and politician from the state of Tennessee. A Republican, Grills has represented the 77th district of the Tennessee House of Representatives, covering Dyer, Lake, and Obion Counties along the Mississippi River, since 2020.

Career
In July 2019, Republican Bill Sanderson resigned from the 77th district of the Tennessee House of Representatives, and fellow Republican Casey Hood was appointed to the seat. Grills, then a farmer and a Dyer County Commissioner, announced he would run against Hood in the November special primary election for the remainder of Sanderson's term. In a four-candidate race, Grills convincingly ousted Hood with 56% of the vote, and went on to easily win the December general election over Democrat Michael Smith and three independents. Grills assumed office on January 14, 2020.

Grills served on conservative grassroots advisory council advocating for Tennessee Governor Bill Lee.

Personal life
Grills lives in Newbern with his wife, Christina "Christi" Marie née Bennett Grills (a registered nurse), and their two children. Grills was homeschooled.

References

Living people
Republican Party members of the Tennessee House of Representatives
21st-century American politicians
1981 births
People from Dyer County, Tennessee